Viya is a telecommunications company that provides landline, mobile telephone, Internet, and cable television services in the United States Virgin Islands. Viya is a subsidiary of ATN International. Prior to its acquisition by ATN,  it was formerly known as Innovative Communications Corporation. In 2015, Choice Communications, which was a former rival telecommunications company and a subsidiary of ATN, purchased Innovative for $145 Million and completed the sale on July 1, 2016.  In 2017, ATN merged both Innovative and Choice to form Viya.

Viya owned the Virgin Islands Daily News until 2008, when it was purchased by Times-Shamrock Communications. Viya formerly operated cable TV services in Sint Maarten until October 2016, when it was acquired by the TelEm Group. They also had formerly operated cable TV services in the British Virgin Islands as well, until their cable systems were destroyed by Hurricane Irma on September 6, 2017.

References 

Communications in the United States Virgin Islands
Privately held companies based in the United States Virgin Islands